Peter of Aragon may refer to 

 Peter I of Aragon and Navarre (c. 1068–1104), King of Aragón and Navarre since 1094
 Ramon Berenguer III, Count of Provence (1158 - 1181), born as Peter of Aragón, Count of the Provence since 1173
 Peter II of Aragon (1178-1213), King of Aragón and Count of Barcelona since 1094
 Peter III of Aragon the Great (1240–1285), King of Aragón since 1276
 Peter of Aragon (1275-1296), son of Peter III of Aragon and Constance II of Sicily
 Peter IV of Aragon (1319–1387), King of Aragón since 1336
 Peter of Aragon, Heir of Sicily (1398–1400), Heir Apparent of Sicily and Heir Presumptive of Aragon
 Peter of Aragon, Count of Alburquerque (1406–1438), infante of Aragon, son of Ferdinand I of Aragon
 Peter V of Aragon (1429–1466), constable of Portugal, claimed the throne of Aragon